Cassia artensis is a species of plant in the family Fabaceae. It is found only in New Caledonia.

References

artensis
Endemic flora of New Caledonia
Endangered plants
Taxonomy articles created by Polbot